Ladycliff College was a small Catholic college in Highland Falls, New York. Founded in 1933 as a woman's college by the Franciscan Sisters of Peekskill, it remained as such until admitting 7 men in 1974.

The 1978 and 1979 graduating classes were the largest in school history with 131 graduates each. The school closed after the 1979–80 school year.

The school was located adjacent to the United States Military Academy at West Point. The  academy acquired the property, and it is the location of the school's museum.

The complete history of Ladycliff College is recounted in Ladycliff Remembered:  A Journey through Time, a book by Linda Buzzeo Best.

External links
 LadyCliff.org, LadyCliff Alumni Association 
 Ladycliff College Alumni at Facebook
 Ladycliff College (historical) at hometownlocator.com

References

Defunct Catholic universities and colleges in the United States
Defunct private universities and colleges in New York (state)
Education in Orange County, New York
Educational institutions disestablished in 1980
Educational institutions established in 1933
Roman Catholic Archdiocese of New York
1933 establishments in New York (state)
Catholic universities and colleges in New York (state)
1980 disestablishments in New York (state)